Tullio Rochlitzer (December 23, 1926 – August 16, 2006) was an Italian-Croatian basketball player and coach. He represented Yugoslavia national basketball team internationally.

Playing career 
A guard, Rochlitzer played for his hometown team Zadar and Belgrade-based team Crvena zvezda between 1945 and 1951. During his stint with the Zvezda he won three Yugoslav Championships.

In 1951, Rochlitzer fled to Italy. In Italy he played for Gallaratese, Pavia, and Vigevano. He retired as a player with Vigevano in 1960.

National team career

Yugoslavia
Rochlitzer was a member of the Yugoslavia national basketball team that participated at the 1947 European Championship in Prague,  Czechoslovakia. Over five tournament games, he averaged 2.4 points per game.

Italy 
Rochlitzer appeared in one game for the Italy national team in 1954.

Coaching career 
As a player-coach Rochlitzer coached Pavia and Vigevano.

Career achievements and awards 
 Yugoslav League champion: 3 (with Crvena zvezda: 1949, 1950, 1951).

References

1926 births
2006 deaths
Basketball players from Zadar
Croatian people of Italian descent
Guards (basketball)
KK Crvena zvezda players
KK Zadar players
Italians of Croatia
Italian men's basketball players
Italian basketball coaches
Pallacanestro Pavia players
Player-coaches
Yugoslav men's basketball players
Yugoslav basketball coaches
Yugoslav emigrants to Italy